Adão N'Zuzi (born 8 June 1963) is an Angolan boxer. He competed in the men's welterweight event at the 1988 Summer Olympics.

References

External links
 

1963 births
Living people
Angolan male boxers
Olympic boxers of Angola
Boxers at the 1988 Summer Olympics
Place of birth missing (living people)
Welterweight boxers